Lake Kildinskoye is a lake in Kolsky District, Murmansk Oblast, Russia. Lake Kildinskoye's proximity to Murmansk, European route E105, and Severomorsk-3 air base has made it a popular year-round tourism location used for various recreational purposes, including sailing regattas during the summer and wind surfing during the winter. Activities related to the Festival of the North, an annual winter sports festival held across Murmansk Oblast since 1934, are held on and round the lake when it is frozen over.

External links

Lakes of Murmansk Oblast